The 1956 Torneo Godó was the fourth edition of the Torneo Godó annual tennis tournament played on clay courts in Barcelona, Spain and it took place from May 28 to June 3, 1956.

Seeds

Draw

Finals

Earlier rounds

Top half

Bottom half

External links
 ITF – Tournament details
 Official tournament website
 ATP tournament profile

Barcelona Open (tennis)
Godo
Spain